Anding is a district of the city of Dingxi, Gansu province, People's Republic of China.

The area of Anding District has been inhabited since the neolithic era, with sites of the Majiayao culture and Qijia culture being discovered in the area. Dingxi city was established in 1096 as a military base of the northern Gong state. By 1142 it became a county and by 1216 Dingxi became the seat of a prefecture. In 2003, Dingxi County became Anding District as it is currently known.

Located entirely on the Loess Plateau, the economy of Anding District is primarily based around agriculture. Potatoes, corn, flax and beans being the most grown.

In 2020 a CGTN reporter visited the village school of Xuechuan Village (薛川村) in Ningyuan town, which in 2020 had eight students; at its peak it had 600. The school was presented as an illustration of the issues of left-behind children, rural poverty and urbanisation.

Administrative divisions
Anding District is divided to 3 subdistricts, 12 towns and 7 townships.
Subdistricts
 Zhonghualu Subdistrict
 Yongdinglu Subdistrict
 Futailu Subdistrict

Towns

Townships

See also
 List of administrative divisions of Gansu

References

 

Anding District
Dingxi